This is the discography of Italian singer Eros Ramazzotti. Since 1984, Ramazzotti has released 13 studio albums including one EP, four international compilation albums, three live albums as well as 37 singles, all of which have charted noticeably high in many European countries as well as in South and Central America. Ramazzotti has sold over 60 million records in his 30 years of career. The Italian star has done duets with several prestigious artists such as Cher, Tina Turner, Andrea Bocelli, Patsy Kensit, Anastacia, Joe Cocker, Luciano Pavarotti, Laura Pausini, and Ricky Martin.

Albums

Studio albums

Notes
 A "Dischi D'oro" edition of Cuori agitati reached 48 on the FIMI chart in 2000. The chart did not began until 1995, so the 1985 release did not have an initial run.

Compilation albums

Live albums

EPs

Notes
 Musica è spent a week at number 98 on the FIMI album chart, which began around nine years after the EP's release, in 2009; thus, it did not have an initial run.

Singles

As lead singer

'Notes
 The 1998 single version of "Terra promessa" was released as the 1997 re-recorded solo version from the album "Eros" as well as a version that featured an additional rap part by Icy Bro.

As featured artist

Notes
A  Did not appear on the official Belgian Ultratop 50 chart, but rather on Ultratip chart, which combines "Airplay and Sales" for the tracks outside the Ultratop 50-chart.

Other appearances

Video albums

Concert tour videos

Notes
(*)^ Note that the listed positions for the Concert DVD Eros Roma Live released in 2004 are for the German audio album chart and the Swiss audio album chart. Note that DVD/Blu-ray albums can chart on Audio Album Chart both in Germany and Switzerland.

References

Discography
Discographies of Italian artists
Pop music discographies
Latin pop music discographies